Mario Vázquez Raña (7 June 1932 – 8 February 2015) was a Mexican businessman and sports administrator, who served on both national and Olympic committees. He served as a member of the executive bcoard of the International Olympic Committee (IOC) and the Association of National Olympic Committees (ANOC) until 2012.  He was the President of the Pan American Sports Organization (PASO).

On 5 April 2008, Vázquez Raña  received international press attention for his statement that the situation in Tibet "is a Chinese problem" that is "not an issue for the Olympic Games."

Career
President of the board of directors of the Hermanos Vázquez Company (1960–1980);
President and director general of the Organización Editorial Mexicana (1975–) the largest newspaper company in Latin America, "Cartones Ponderosa" (2001–) and
 owned United Press International (1985–1988) 

On 15 March 2012 he resigned from the IOC, IOC Executive Board and as the head of the Association of National Olympic Committees. He also resigned from being the President of the Olympic Solidarity Commission. He continued to serve as the head of the Pan American Sports Organization.

2012 Controversy
In 2012, Vázquez Raña came under media scrutiny for allegedly manipulating news stories in newspapers controlled by the Organización Editorial Mexicana in favor of  Enrique Peña Nieto, presidential candidate of the Institutional Revolutionary Party.

On 11 May 2012, Enrique Peña Nieto gave a speech at the Universidad Iberoamericana in Mexico City as part of his 2012 presidential campaign. He was jeered by the general student population upon arrival, but was allowed to deliver his remarks. Multiple newspapers belonging to the Organización Editorial Mexicana including El Sol de México and Diario de Xalapa covered the story by printing identical headlines labeling Peña Nieto's speech a "success" after an attempted "boycott" by leftist activists. The university incident, as well as the coverage by newspapers controlled by Vázquez Raña subsequently received media attention and scrutiny.

Sports
Vásquez Raña participated in shooting competitions at national and international level in 1960.
grupo star (2010)

Sports Administration
President of the Mexican Shooting Federation (1969–1974);
President of the American Shooting Confederation (1973–1979);
Vice-President of the Mexican Sports Confederation (1973–1976);
member of the Mexican Olympic Committee (Comité Olímpico Mexicano) (1972–1974) then
President (1974–2001);
President of the PanAmerican Games Organization Committee (1975);
President, Pan American Sports Organization (1975–2015);
President of the Association of National Olympic Committees (ANOC) (1979–2012)

Positions with the IOC
Member of the Executive Board as representative of NOCs (2000–2012);
Vice-Chairman of the Olympic Solidarity Commission (1979–1996),
Deputy Chairman (1997–2001) then
Chairman (2002–2012);
member of the following Commissions:
Olympic Movement (1990–1999),
Preparation of the XII Olympic Congress (1990–1994),
Apartheid and Olympism (1990–1992),
"IOC 2000" (Executive Committee, 1999),
Marketing (2000),
IOC 2000 Reform Follow-up (2002).

Awards 

In 1986 Vázquez received the Eagle Award from the United States Sports Academy.  The Eagle Award is the Academy's highest international honor and was awarded to Vázquez for his significant contributions in promoting international harmony, peace, and goodwill through the effective use of sport.

See also
Organización Editorial Mexicana

References

Additional references
 IOC bio

1932 births
2015 deaths
Businesspeople from Mexico City
Mexican newspaper chain founders
International Olympic Committee members